Sten Olmre (born 31 January 1995) is an Estonian professional basketball player who currently plays for the Estonian team TTÜ of Korvpalli Meistriliiga and the Baltic Basketball League.

References

1995 births
Living people
BC Kalev/Cramo players
Estonian men's basketball players
KK Pärnu players
Korvpalli Meistriliiga players
Shooting guards
Basketball players from Tallinn
TTÜ KK players